Rusev, female version Ruseva is a Bulgarian language surname derived from the first name Rusi and it may refer to:

Rusev (wrestler), ring name of Bulgarian professional wrestler Miroslav Barnyashev.
Angel Rusev (footballer), Bulgarian footballer
Desislav Rusev, Bulgarian footballer
Dilma Rousseff, 36th President of Brazil
Georgi Rusev, Bulgarian actor
Ivan Rusev (footballer), Bulgarian footballer
Ivan Rusev (badminton), Bulgarian badminton player
Nikolay Rusev, Bulgarian footballer
Nikolina Ruseva, Bulgarian sprint canoer
Svetlin Rusev, Bulgarian artist
Yanko Rusev, Bulgarian weightlifter

Bulgarian-language surnames